Philosophia Africana was a peer-reviewed academic journal of Africana philosophy established in 1998. It was published at DePaul University under the editorship of Emmanuel Chukwudi Eze until his death in 2007, and was subsequently edited by K. Kalumba (Ball State University). The journal won the 2002 Council of Editors of Learned Journals award for Best New Journal. It ceased publication of new issues in Fall 2016. Online access to published issues is provided by the Philosophy Documentation Center.

See also 
 List of philosophy journals

References

External links 
 

Philosophy journals
African studies journals
Publications established in 1998
Africana philosophy
DePaul University
Philosophy Documentation Center academic journals